The Road to Victory is a 1944 short film from Warner Brothers notable for the appearance of Bing Crosby, a major singing and movie star, Cary Grant, a major actor in motion pictures, and Frank Sinatra, a young singer who would soon become a movie star himself. The short also featured Benny Goodman and Harry James. The movie was intended to promote the U.S. Fifth War Loan and was an edited and truncated re-release of The Shining Future from the same year.

Sinatra sings "Hot Time in the Town of Berlin" and Crosby sings "The Road to Victory" (written by Frank Loesser).

See also
Hot time in the town of Berlin: when the Yanks go marching in

References

External links

1944 films
American drama short films
1944 drama films
American black-and-white films
1940s American films
1940s English-language films